James Cletus Pehler (February 23, 1942 – September 22, 2021) was an American politician and educator.

Pehler was born in Grand Rapids, Minnesota, and graduated from Fairmont High School in Fairmont, Minnesota, in 1960. He received his bachelor's and master's degrees in communications studies from St. Cloud State University in 1965 and 1967. He worked for several television and radio stations in the St. Cloud area as a student. He then taught in the radio and television area of the St. Cloud State University department of mass communication and was an associate professor. Pehler served in the Minnesota House of Representatives from 1973 to 1980 and in the Minnesota Senate from 1981 to 1990. He was a Democrat. Pehler died at his home in St. Cloud, Minnesota.

References

1942 births
2021 deaths
People from Fairmont, Minnesota
People from Grand Rapids, Minnesota
Politicians from St. Cloud, Minnesota
St. Cloud State University alumni
St. Cloud State University faculty
Democratic Party Minnesota state senators
Democratic Party members of the Minnesota House of Representatives